Women for Wik is an organisation of women, including Aboriginal, non-Aboriginal and non-Torres Strait Islanders, which has established an independent, rigorous, verifiable, complete and objective monitoring of the Australian Federal Government's intervention in the Northern Territory and an Australian travel guide and information service.

References
 Green Left
 Sherlock, Emily, "Reconciliation 'a political ploy' Focus on rights not referendum", Fairfax Digital, 14 October 2007
 Web Diary

Organisations serving Indigenous Australians
Women's organisations based in Australia